Live in Cuba is the first live DVD from the American rock supergroup Audioslave. Performed in front of an audience of 70,000 people, Live in Cuba is considered an historic event as it marks one of the few times that American musicians were permitted to play in Cuba. Despite the bureaucratic obstacles resulting from the ongoing United States embargo against Cuba, Audioslave received permission to perform in Havana and altered their tour schedule to play a free concert on May 6, 2005. With special approval by U.S. President George W. Bush and Cuban President Fidel Castro, the concert was organized through joint authorization of the United States Department of Treasury and the Cuban Institute of Music. At the time, guitarist Tom Morello declared that Audioslave was the first American rock and roll band to play a concert in Cuba. However, other American musical artists played in Cuba prior to 2005. At the Havana Jam in March 1979, Billy Joel, Stephen Stills, Weather Report, and several other American pop and jazz artists performed at Havana's Karl Marx Theatre. The Fabulous Titans, an American reggae/ska band, performed in Cuba in 1981. 

The DVD consists of footage from the concert performed at Havana's Plaza Anti Imperialista, plus a 37-minute documentary based on Audioslave's experiences in Cuba. The documentary focuses on the band's interactions with the Cuban people and highlights their appreciation of the island's arts and culture. The concert setlist consists mostly of Audioslave songs from the band's first two albums, Audioslave and Out of Exile. However, the band also performs several "Audioslave-ized" versions of songs from Soundgarden ("Spoonman" and "Outshined") and Rage Against the Machine ("Bulls on Parade" and "Sleep Now in the Fire"). After a triumphant concert that included moshing and crowd surfing, Tom Morello stated that Audioslave had "single-handedly demolished the rock and roll blockade against Cuba."

Although the Live in Cuba DVD was released five months after Audioslave's second studio album, Out of Exile, the DVD footage was recorded shortly before the album's May 23, 2005 release date. Because of this timing, the Live in Cuba DVD documents the debut of the track "Heaven's Dead." Two versions of the DVD were released on October 11, 2005, a standard edition and a special edition. The standard edition consists of the DVD only. The special edition consists of the DVD plus an audio CD of live Sessions@AOL tracks.

Track listing
 "Set It Off"
 "Your Time Has Come"
 "Like a Stone"
 "Spoonman"*
 "The Worm"
 "Gasoline"
 "Heaven's Dead"*
 "Doesn't Remind Me"
 "Be Yourself"
 "Bulls on Parade" / "Sleep Now in the Fire" 
 "Out of Exile"
 "Outshined"
 "Shadow on the Sun"*
 "Black Hole Sun" (Cornell Acoustic Solo)*
 "I Am the Highway"
 "Show Me How to Live"
 "Cochise"

Note: * indicates tracks exclusive to the Special Edition

Special Edition AOL Sessions audio CD

 "Be Yourself"
 "Loud Love"
 "Doesn't Remind Me"
 "Out of Exile"
 "Sleep Now in the Fire"

Personnel 

Audioslave
 Tim Commerford – bass guitar, backing vocals
 Chris Cornell – lead vocals, acoustic guitar
 Tom Morello – lead guitar
 Brad Wilk – drums, percussion

Filmmakers
Lawrence Jordan – Director
Bill Martinez – Executive Producer
Carolina Sanchez – Executive Producer
Cynthis Semon – Executive Producer
Jack Gulick – Producer
Al Masocco – Producer
Heidi Kelso – Line Producer
Joseph Sassone – Line Producer (Documentary)
Daniel E. Catullo – Consulting Producer

Production
Rick Fagan – Tour Manager 
Robert Long Jr. – Production Manager (Tour) 
Simon Pizey – Head of Production
Emma Sheldon – Production Manager
Geoff Frood – Lighting Director
Toby Francis – Front of House Engineer
Jerrell Evans – Monitor Engineer
Jacob Mann – Sound Technician
Robin Delwiche – Sound Recordist
Ian Dyckoff – Live Recording Engineer
Karl Egsieker – Sound Mixer
Rob Garcia – Sound (Documentary)
Gabriel Scott – Sound (Documentary)
Brendan O'Brien – Sound Mixer (Silent Sound Studios)
Stephen Marcussen – Audio Mastering (Marcussen Mastering)
Louie Teran – Digital Sound Editor (Marcussen Mastering)
Martin Richardson – Guitar Technician
Craig Baker – Bass Guitar Technician
Bradley Stonner – Drum Technician
Andrew Veasey - Drum Technician

Cinematography
Steve Watson – Camera Supervisor
Felix Andrews – Camera Operator (Documentary)
Joseph Sassone – Camera Operator (Documentary)
Mitch Blighe – Camera Operator
Kess Bohan – Camera Operator
Alejandro Demetrius – Camera Operator
Greg Duffield – Camera Operator
Maxim Ford – Camera Operator
Philip Millard – Camera Operator
Adam Rodgers – Camera Operator
Oliver Russell - Camera Operator
Phil Walker – Camera Operator
Nick Wheeler – Camera Operator
Roger John Berry – Camera Technician
Aaron Hughes – Camera Technician
Chris Methven – Camera Technician
Ronin Novoa – Assistant Camera
Edgar Pahua – Assistant Camera (Documentary)
Pablo Trujillo – Assistant Camera (Documentary)

Editorial staff
Jonathan Covert – Editor
Buck Huckler – Editor
Bill Yukich – Editor
Shawn Dack – Assistant Editor
Kato Fong – Assistant Editor
D. B. Robertson – Assistant Editor

References

Audioslave video albums
2005 video albums
Live video albums
2005 live albums
Albums produced by Chris Cornell
Albums produced by Rick Rubin
Epic Records live albums
Epic Records video albums
Interscope Records live albums